Jia Mi (died 7 May 300), courtesy name Changyuan, originally named Han Mi, was a Chinese politician of the Jin dynasty (266–420). He was the grandson of the Jin minister Jia Chong and nephew of Jin's de facto ruler between 291 and 300, Jia Nanfeng. Jia Mi was trusted with state affair by his aunt throughout her regency and wielded much influence over the Jin court. He was an extravagant minister, and under him, the Jin court became increasingly corrupted. Between 299 and 300, Jia Mi pushed his aunt for the removal and later execution of the Crown Prince, Sima Yu, a decision that would lead to the Jia clan's downfall. In 300, Jia Mi was killed during Sima Lun's coup d'état.

Life

Early life and background 
Han Mi was born in Xiangling County, Pingyang Commandery (平陽, roughly modern Linfen, Shanxi). He was the grandson of the powerful minister, Jia Chong, through his mother, Jia Wu, who was married to an official named Han Shou (韓壽). He was described as having a beautiful appearance. Jia Chong died in 282 without leaving a male heir. Because of this, Han Mi's grandmother, Guo Huai, decided to make Han Mi the adopted son of Chong's deceased eldest son and initial heir, Jia Limin (賈黎民). Han Mi thus changed his name to Jia Mi, and succeeded his grandfather's title of Duke of Lu.

Handling state affairs 
In 290, Emperor Wu of Jin died and was succeeded by his developmentally disabled son, Emperor Hui. Emperor Hui's wife, Jia Nanfeng, was Jia Mi's aunt. Following her successful coup against her husband's regent, Yang Jun in 291, Empress Jia appointed Jia Mi as one of the few people to handle state affairs alongside Jia Mo (賈模), Guo Zhang (Empress Jia's maternal relative), Sima Wei and Sima Yao (司馬繇). Soon, Sima Yao was sent into exile while Sima Wei was executed by Empress Jia later in 291, leaving her family solely in power over the court. Both Jia Mi and Jia Nanfeng considered if they should remove the minister Zhang Hua as well, but through Pei Wei's consultation, they concluded that he was loyal to the Jia clan and pose no threat. 

Shortly after the coup against Yang Jun, Jia Mi began meeting with many scholars-officials and filling his house with guests. Some of these scholar-officials began to closely associate themselves with Jia Mi, and they would be known as the "Twenty-Four Friends of Jingu". The closest of these associates were Shi Chong and Pan Yue, who constantly showered him with flattery. Purportedly, whenever the two spot Jia Mi and Guo Huai travelling together, they would get off their carriages, stand by the side of the road to bow down and pay their respects.

With his aunt ruling behind the curtains, Jia Mi's power was said to have exceeded that of a sovereign. He also had a very extravagant behaviour. The luxuriousness of his mansion was said to have surpassed that of his status. His possessions and clothings were usually rare and beautiful. He would also get the best singers and dancing girls to perform for him. Because of this, many throughout the state would rush to visit his residence whenever he held a grand banquet. Jia Mi's writing was praised by many during his time, so much so that he was compared to the Western Han dynasty writer, Jia Yi.

In 296, the Prince of Zhao, Sima Lun was called to the capital due to negligence over military affairs in Qinzhou and Yongzhou. At the advice of Sun Xiu, Sima Lun befriended Jia Mi along with the Empress and Guo Zhang to gain their trust. The same year, Guo Huai died, so Jia Mi temporarily resigned from his positions of Cavalier In Regular Attendance and General of the Rear Army to mourn. 

Even before the mourning period had ended, he was appointed Custodian of the Private Library to revise the Jin dynasty's national history. During his tenure, Emperor Hui ordered for another discussion to decide on which date should serve as a division point between Jin and its predecessor, Cao Wei after a previous one failed to reach a conclusive agreement. Following some debate, Jia Mi chose to listen to the opinions of Zhang Hua, Wang Rong and others that the first year of Taishi (Sima Yan's ascension on February 8, 266) would serve as the starting year of the Jin dynasty. 

In 299, the Master of Writing to the Ministry of Personnel, Liu Song, established a system of nine classes to assess each minister's capability and how they should be rewarded or punished. However, this was never properly implemented due to the fact that Jia Mi and Guo Zhang opposed this as it limited their influences. Furthermore, it was not well-received by officials who wanted to advance their careers quicker through bribery. Under Jia Mi and Guo Zhang, bribery was very common in the Jin government as officials would present the two with gifts to curry their favour. A satirical article titled Discussion on the Divinity of Money (錢神論) was written by the hermit, Lu Bao (魯褒) to criticize this trend.

Conflict with Crown Prince Sima Yu 
Crown Prince Sima Yu was despised by the Jia family due to the fact that he was not Jia Nanfeng's biological son. Jia Mi also disliked Sima Yu and refused to treat him with proper ceremony even after his grandmother told him to treat Yu kindly. Both Guo Huai and Sima Yu proposed that Yu marry with Jia Mi's sister to establish stronger ties between Yu and the Jia clan. However, this was turned down by Empress Jia and Jia Wu. Instead, the sisters wedded Sima Yu to Wang Yan's younger daughter and Jia Mi to Wang's elder daughter. Sima Yu was discontent at the fact that Jia Mi was given the most beautiful of the two. 

In 299, Jia Mi was made a tutor to Sima Yu. However, Jia Mi still refused to show him respect. Sima Yu's uncle, the Prince of Chengdu, Sima Ying, confronted and scolded Jia Mi for his rudeness towards the Crown Prince. Jia Mi was angered by this, so he brought the matter to Empress Jia and arranged for Sima Ying to be moved away from Luoyang to Yecheng, assuringly to have him command the garrison. The hostile reception from Jia Mi caused Sima Yu to avoid him despite his Attendant, Pei Kai (裴權) warning him not to. 

Jia Mi eventually took steps to remove Sima Yu from his title of Crown Prince. He told Empress Jia that Sima Yu would seek to destroy the Jia clan if he were to succeed Emperor Hui. He suggested to her that a more submissive and controllable Crown Prince should replace him at once. Empress Jia agreed with her nephew, so she began spreading degrading rumours of Sima Yu. She also started pretending to stuff objects such as hay under her cloths to give the assumption that she was pregnant, and also adopted Jia Mi's brother, Han Weizu (韓慰祖), as her own. 

Finally, Sima Yu was made a commoner and later put under house arrest after he was tricked into writing a threatening edict against his father. Before he was escorted to Xuchang, an edict was made forbidding any minister to see him leave. However, some ministers like Jiang Tong and Wang Dun ignored it to bid their farewells. These ministers were thrown into jail in Luoyang and Henan, but the prisoners in Henan were purposefully released by Yue Guang. The official, Sun Tan (孫琰), admonished Jia Mi to let the prisoners and Yue Guang off to prevent further exalting over Sima Yu. Jia Mi agreed and ordered the Prefect of Luoyang, Cao Shu (曹攄) to release the prisoners in Luoyang.

Sima Lun's coup and death 
Many in the Jin court were unhappy with what had happened to Sima Yu. A group of conspirators flocked to Sima Lun who had the military capacity to stage a coup against the Jia clan. Lun agreed, but Sun Xiu told him to delay the plot in order to first get rid of Sima Yu, who they saw as a roadblock to their imperial ambition. Sun Xiu began to spread a rumour of a plot to place Sima Yu on the throne which reached Empress Jia. As Empress Jia began to worry, Sima Lun and Sun Xiu advised Jia Mi that he should convince his aunt to kill Sima Yu to destroy any hope of restoration. Jia Mi did so, and on April 27, 300, Sima Yu was forced to commit suicide. 

On the day of the coup, Sima Lun presented a forged edict from Emperor Hui, denouncing Empress Jia, Jia Mi and their partisans and calling for the Empress's disposal. The Prince of Qi, Sima Jiong, had his own edict summoning Jia Mi to have him executed. Hearing this, Jia Mi fled under the Western Bells (西鍾), where he reportedly cried out, "O Empress, save me!". He was eventually caught and beheaded while his aunt was overthrown and later forced to commit suicide.

Twenty-Four Friends of Jingu 
The Twenty-Four Friends of Jingu (金谷二十四友) was an inner circle comprising celebrities in art and literature. All members were politically associated with Jia Mi and would usually socialize at Shi Chong's Jingu Garden (金谷園) in Luoyang. There, they would discuss current affairs, talk about literature, recite poetry and compose fus with one another. The group went into decline following Sima Lun's coup in 300. Apart from Jia Mi's execution, Shi Chong was also sentenced to death by Sun Xiu and had all his property confiscated later in 300. Other members who were purged by Sima Lun and Sun Xiu were Ouyang Jian, Pan Yue and Du Bin (杜斌). Some, like Lu Ji, sided with Sima Lun during the coup and served under his government. The group's associates were:

 Shi Chong
 Ouyang Jian
 Pan Yue
 Lu Ji
 Lu Yun
 Miao Zhi (缪徵)
 Du Bin
 Zhi Yu
 Zhuge Quan (諸葛銓)
 Wang Cui (王粹)
 Du Yu (杜毓)
 Zou Jie (鄒捷)
 Zuo Si
 Cui Ji (崔基)
 Liu Gui (劉瑰)
 He Yu (和郁)
 Zhou Hui (周恢)
 Qian Xiu
 Chen Zhen (陳眕)
 Guo Zhang
 Xu Meng (許猛)
 Liu Na (劉訥)
 Liu Yu
 Liu Kun

Note

References 

 Fang, Xuanling (ed.) (648). Book of Jin (Jin Shu).
 Sima, Guang (1084). Zizhi Tongjian.

300 deaths
Executed Jin dynasty (266–420) people
Jin dynasty (266–420) politicians
Politicians from Shanxi